Nova Viçosa is a municipality in the state of Bahia in the North-East region of Brazil. It was "discovered" in 1720 and became a municipality in 1962.
The municipality contains part of the Cassurubá Extractive Reserve, a  sustainable use conservation unit that protects an area of mangroves, river and sea where shellfish are harvested.

Nova Viçosa has a district called Posto da Mata, where a sub-prefecture.

See also
List of municipalities in Bahia

References

Populated coastal places in Bahia
Municipalities in Bahia